David Henry Frisch (March 12, 1918 – May 23, 1991) was an American physicist who helped develop the atom bomb in World War II and later became active in the disarmament movement.  He was also the husband of Rose Epstein Frisch.

Biography
Born in New York, Frisch grew up in San Antonio and graduated from Princeton in 1940. He was a graduate assistant at the University of Wisconsin–Madison from 1940 to 1942, and then worked at Los Alamos from 1943 to 1945. After the war he moved to MIT, beginning as a research associate in 1946, obtained his PhD in 1947 and was appointed an assistant professor in 1948, associate professor in 1952 and full professor in 1958. He retired in 1988.

Frisch was a fellow of the American Physical Society and of the American Academy of Arts and Sciences. He was the recipient of Fulbright, Guggenheim, Alfred P. Sloan and National Science Foundation research fellowships.

Frisch served on the Physics Advisory Committee of the National Science Foundation, on the Brookhaven High Energy Advisory Committee, and was chairman of the Long-Range Planning committee of the Fermi National Accelerator Laboratory.

Frisch was active in the field of nuclear disarmament, participating in the Moscow Pugwash Conference in 1960, editing the book Arms Reduction in 1961, and participating in the 1962 Woods Hole Summer Study on Inspection.

Among his scientific publications was a 1963 paper in which he and James H. Smith succeeded in showing objective time dilation in the decay of cosmic muons. A thirty-five-minute movie describing this experiment performed both on the top of Mount Washington in New Hampshire as well as at MIT is available online.

He was married to biologist Rose Frisch.

Selected publications
D.H. Frisch and J.H. Smith, Am. J. Phys., 31, 342-355 (1963).

References

External links
2015 Video Interview with Henry Frisch, son of David Frisch Voices of the Manhattan Project

20th-century American physicists
1918 births
1991 deaths
Manhattan Project people